Before the Politburo, an organ with the same functions, known as the Standing Committee of the Central Committee, was the leading Party organ.

Members
Standing Committee of the Central Committee of the Indochinese Communist Party since 1941: Trường Chinh (General Secretary), Hoàng Văn Thụ and Hoàng Quốc Việt.

Standing Committee of the Central Committee of the Indochinese Communist Party since 1945:  Hồ Chí Minh (President of the Democratic Republic of Vietnam), Trường Chinh (General Secretary), Võ Nguyên Giáp, Lê Đức Thọ, Hoàng Quốc Việt, Nguyễn Lương Bằng (supplement).

Notes

References

Bibliography

 

.1
1930 in Vietnam
1951 in Vietnam